Calytrix exstipulata, commonly known as Kimberley heather, is a species of plant in the myrtle family Myrtaceae that is endemic to Western Australia.

It usually blooms between March and September producing white-pink star-shaped flowers.

Found on plateaus, among rock outcrops and along watercourses in the Kimberley region of Western Australia where it grows on sand or clay soils.

References

Plants described in 1828
exstipulata
Flora of Western Australia